Dame Yvonne Moores, DBE, FRSH, CIMgt (born 14 June 1941) is a retired British nurse. She is a former Chief Nursing Officer for Wales, for Scotland and for England. As a Director of the NHS, she played a key role as advisor to the Prime Minister and Secretary of State for Health on a range of issues related to policy and improving the quality of clinical services.

Moores serves as consultant to the United Nations and the World Health Organization. She has been a Pro-Chancellor at Bournemouth University and Council Chair of Southampton University (2000–06).

In 1999, she was named Dame Commander of the Order of the British Empire.

References

External links
 University of Bournemouth Portal

1941 births
British nurses
Dames Commander of the Order of the British Empire
Fellows of the Royal Society for Public Health
Living people
People associated with the University of Southampton
People associated with Bournemouth University
Place of birth missing (living people)
NHS Chief Professional Officers